BOBO is a Chinese boy band composed of two members, Jing Boran and Fu Xinbo.

The two became famous after competing in the 2007 My Hero competition, with Jing Boran  winning first and Fu Xinbo third. In 2008, the two released their own EP, Glory, and then the album, The Big World. Since their debut, they have won multiple new artists awards.

In 2008, they performed during the pre-ceremony performance of the 2008 Summer Paralympics opening ceremony. The two also began their acting career in 2008, with Fu Xinbo playing in I am Veeker  and Jing Boran in A Tribute to Stephen Chow.

Origin of the name
Both members of the group have a "bo" sound in their names. When combined, Jing Boran's Bo and Fu Xinbo's Bo, form the name BOBO.

Fanclubs
Jing Boran's fanclub is known as BBF, standing for BaBy Face because during the My Hero competition, one judge called Jing Boran Baby Face.
Fu Xinbo's fanclub is known as BBT, standing for Bong Bang Tang, another term for lollipop. He was also nicknamed “Little Meat Bun" for his puffy cheeks. Fans of BoBo as a whole are called BBS, or BOBO'S fans.

Discography

Awards
2007 My Hero National Competition
 First Place - Jing Boran
 Most Popular - Jing Boran
 Third Place - Fu Xinbo
 Most Photogenic - Fu Xinbo
2007 BQ
 Most Popular New Artist First Place - Fu Xinbo
 Most Popular New Artist Second Place - Jing Boran
 Best Idol of the Year
2007 FM 917  Vacation Awards Ceremony
 Most Popular Group
 Golden Melody - Glory (EP)
2007 QQ Starlight Ceremony
 Group With the Most Potential
2007 Sina Internet Awards
 Most Popular Group
2007 Music Radio Top Chinese Charts
 Most Popular Group in Mainland
 Golden Melody - Glory (EP)
2008 University Students Music Festival
 Most Popular New Artists

References

External links
  Official Website
  Official Fanclub
  Fu Xinbo's blog
  Jing Boran's blog

Chinese Mandopop singers
Living people
Singing talent show winners
Chinese boy bands
Mandopop musical groups
Year of birth missing (living people)